Stampley is a surname. Notable people with the surname include:

Joe Stampley (born 1943), American country music singer
Micah Stampley (born 1971), American gospel singer-songwriter and actor
Nathaniel Stampley, African-American actor

See also
Stapley